Biswanath Agrawal (born 15 October, 1944) is an Indian Judge and former Judge of the Supreme Court of India.

Career
Agrawal was born in 1944. He passed LL.B. and started practice in the Patna High Court in 1996. He worked mainly in Civil and Constitutional matters. He was appointed a judge of Patna High Court on 17 November 1986. Agarwal became the Chief Justice of Orissa High Court in November 1999. Thereafter he was elevated to the post of the Justice of Supreme Court of India on 19 October 2000.

Controversy 
In September 2017, it was alleged by the Central Bureau of Investigation (CBI) that Mr. Agrawal took large sums from the Prasad Institute of Medical Sciences in Lucknow to help in getting them favourable orders. A special investigation team was formed by the Supreme Court to investigate the issue.

References

1944 births
Judges of the Patna High Court
Chief Justices of the Orissa High Court
20th-century Indian judges
Justices of the Supreme Court of India
Living people